Per Kærsgaard Laursen (born 7 November 1955) is a Danish former cyclist. He competed in the team time trial event at the 1980 Summer Olympics.

References

External links
 

1955 births
Living people
Danish male cyclists
Olympic cyclists of Denmark
Cyclists at the 1980 Summer Olympics
Cyclists from Copenhagen